Lee Newman (born 1 May 1973) is a Welsh male athlete who competes in the shot put and discus events. He has personal best distances of 18.85 metres and 60.48 metres respectively in these events. Newman was National Record Holder in the Discus for more than a decade.

Newman coached his then wife, Shelley Newman (nee Drew) to the Olympic Games in Discus in 2004.

After retiring from sports, Newman built a successful career in Private Equity running multi-national companies.

Athletics career
Newman competed in the discus event at the 1998 Commonwealth Games in Kuala Lumpur, Malaysia finishing 7th and competed in both the discus and shot put events at the 2002 Commonwealth Games in Manchester, England finishing 8th and 11th respectively.

He has won three bronze medals at British championships, two in the shot put in 1994 and 1999 and one in the discus in 1999.

References

1973 births
Living people
British male discus throwers
British male shot putters
Athletes (track and field) at the 1998 Commonwealth Games
Athletes (track and field) at the 2002 Commonwealth Games
Commonwealth Games competitors for Wales